Barriers is a British children's television series, created and written by William Corlett, and made by Tyne Tees Television for ITV between 1981 and 1982.

The series starred Benedict Taylor as Billy Stanyon, a teenager facing up to the loss of his parents in a sailing accident only to discover that he was adopted. Billy then sets off on a journey to find his real parents that takes him across Europe. The series was filmed on location in Scotland, Germany and Austria. An initial series of thirteen episodes in 1981 was followed by a further seven episodes in 1982.

Cast

 Benedict Taylor as Billy Stanyon
 Paul Rogers as Vincent Whitaker
 Laurence Naismith as Dr. Ernest Jolland
 Patricia Lawrence as Miss. Price

Recurring characters:
 Siân Phillips as Mrs. Dalgleish (Series 1-2)
 Brigitte Horney as Elsa Gruber (Series 1)
 Ursula Lingen as Hilde Gruber (Series 1)
 Robert Addie as Spike (Series 1)
 Siegfried Rauch as Kurt Gruber (Series 2)

Guest stars (single-episode appearance):
 Nicholas Courtney as Henri Beauvoir (Series 1, Episode 7)

External links

1981 British television series debuts
1982 British television series endings
1980s British children's television series
ITV children's television shows
1980s British drama television series
Television series by ITV Studios
Television shows produced by Tyne Tees Television
English-language television shows